Abul Kalam Azad (born 1 March 1939) is a  Jatiya Sangsad member representing the Jamalpur-1 constituency. He is also a former information and cultural affairs minister of Bangladesh.

Career
From 2009 to 2012, Azad served as the Minister of Information.

Controversies 

Censorship
In 2009, when Azad was inaugurated as the minister of information, he promised journalists that the government would ensure right to information and freethinking in Bangladesh and sought "constructive criticism" from editors in the print and electronic media.
However, in 2010, he changed his stance and ordered that the government would enact a law to curb what he term "yellow journalism". Analysts say such laws were only enacted to curb the freedom of the press and dissident voices.  The Press Secretary to the Prime Minister of Bangladesh, Abul Kalam Azad, said "pornography has spread like a disease in Bangladesh".

Intra-party feud
In 2015, Azad was sent a show cause order by his own party, the Bangladesh Awami League for working against party policy and supporting a rebel candidate.

References

Living people
1939 births
Awami League politicians
Information ministers of Bangladesh
Cultural Affairs ministers of Bangladesh
9th Jatiya Sangsad members
10th Jatiya Sangsad members
11th Jatiya Sangsad members
Place of birth missing (living people)